Joe Daniel (born December 5, 1954) is a former Canadian politician. He was a Conservative member of the House of Commons of Canada from 2011 to 2015 who represented the Toronto riding of Don Valley East. He was the first Canadian MP of Malayali Indian descent.

Background
Daniel was born in Dar es Salaam, Tanzania. He came to Canada in 1987 to work on a contract with the Canadian military. In 1995, he moved to Toronto and joined (IBM) Celestica Inc. where he worked for 14 years as a manager in engineering. He was also a part-time professor at Humber and Centennial College and during this period presented a number of papers on fibre optic technology.

Politics
In the 2011 Canadian federal election, he ran as the Conservative candidate in the Toronto riding of Don Valley East. He defeated Liberal incumbent Yasmin Ratansi by 870 votes. He served as a backbench member of the Stephen Harper government.

In the 2015 election he ran in the new riding of Don Valley North but lost to newcomer Geng Tan by 6,215 votes. During the election, Daniel was recorded giving a talk in front of supporters where he was quoted as saying that the 2015 refugee crisis was part of a Muslim agenda, which he would oppose and not allow it to spread to Canada. He refused media requests for clarification of his statement, as part of his policy to avoid all interviews with media until after the election. Later, during an all-candidates debate in October, Daniel referred to the "so-called" Syrian refugees, questioned their need for food and water, and criticized the Middle East for not doing more to support them.

In March 2017, Daniel attempted a comeback by running for the Conservative Party nomination for an April by-election in Markham—Thornhill, but was defeated by journalist and radio host Gavan Paranchothy.

Electoral record

References

External links
 

1954 births
Canadian people of Malayali descent
Conservative Party of Canada MPs
Living people
Members of the House of Commons of Canada from Ontario
Politicians from Toronto
Tanzanian emigrants to Canada
21st-century Canadian politicians
Canadian politicians of Indian descent